Zuzana Vejvodová (born 19 September 1980, Prague, Czechoslovakia) is a Czech actress.

In 2000 she graduated from Prague Conservatory. Afterwards she joined Divadlo Na Fidlovačce (DNF). She regularly performs in TV films and series. In April 2008 she was shortlisted for TýTý Award, an annual Czech television award, in one of the categories. She is daughter of composer and bandleader Josef Vejvoda and granddaughter of Jaromír Vejvoda.

Selected performances
 2009 – Irina in Three sisters
 2006 – Desdemona in Othello, Summer Shakespeare Festival at the Prague Castle (SSF)
 2006 – Millie Dillmount in Thoroughly Modern Millie, DNF
 2005 – Jacie Triplethree in Comic Potential, DNF
 2005 – Viola in Twelfth Night, or What You Will, SSF
 2004 – Juliet in Romeo and Juliet, SSF
 2003 – Rosalind in As You Like It, DNF
 2003 – Tereza in Rebelové, Divadlo Broadway Praha
 2002 – Agatha in The Marriage, DNF
 2001 – Nele - Betkina - Anna in Thyl Ulenspiegel by Grigory Gorin and Gennady Gladkov, DNF
 2001 – Denise in Mam'zelle Nitouche, DNF
 2000 – Bandit's Sweetheart in Painted on Glass by Ernest Bryll and Katarzyna Gärtner, DNF (10 years on repertoire)
 1998 – Annabella in 'Tis Pity She's a Whore, Divadlo na Vinohradech
 1998 – Chava in Fiddler on the Roof, DNF (in 2011 still on repertoire)

Selected filmography
2007 – Alžběta in The Countesses (Hraběnky)
2004 – Kamila Stösslová in In Search of Janacek (Hledání Janáčka)
1991 – Leontýnka in The Territory of White Deer (Území bílých králů)

Notes

External links

Official website 

1980 births
Living people
Actresses from Prague
Czech stage actresses
Czech film actresses
Czech television actresses
20th-century Czech actresses
21st-century Czech actresses
Prague Conservatory alumni